William Walton Thomson Hannah (9 October 1912 – 26 February 1966) was an Anglican clergyman from Forest Row, Sussex who converted to Roman Catholicism and who wrote the book Darkness Visible.

In January 1951, Hannah wrote an article "Should a Christian be a Freemason?" in Theology, a magazine produced by the Society for Promoting Christian Knowledge. This was controversial, as both the King and Geoffrey Fisher, the Archbishop of Canterbury, were Freemasons, as were many Anglican clerics. The Church of England Assembly discussed the subject in June 1951, although there was no substantive conclusion.

Darkness Visible was published in 1952.  He later published Christian by Degrees, left England for Canada and became a Roman Catholic priest.

Hannah earned his M.A. from the University of Edinburgh in 1934. He died in Montreal in 1966.

Works
Darkness Visible, 1952. 
Christian by Degrees, 1954.

References

External links

1912 births
1966 deaths
Christianity and Freemasonry
Anglican priest converts to Roman Catholicism
20th-century English Anglican priests
English Roman Catholics
Alumni of the University of Edinburgh
People from Forest Row